Heidelberga (minor planet designation: 325 Heidelberga) is a large Main belt asteroid that was discovered by German astronomer Max Wolf on 4 March 1892 in Heidelberg.

Based upon its spectrum, 325 Heidelberga is classified as an M-type asteroid. No absorption features have been detected with certainty, indicating it most likely has a nickel-iron or enstatite chondrite composition.

References

External links 
 
 

000325
Discoveries by Max Wolf
Named minor planets
000325
18920304